Santa Clara Valley Athletic League (SCVAL) is a high school athletic conference and part of the CIF Central Coast Section of the California Interscholastic Federation. Its 14+ member schools are in the northern part of the Santa Clara Valley. Each sport is divided into two leagues based on strength. The De Anza League is for stronger teams and El Camino League is for weaker teams.

History
The SCVAL was established in 1973 and had 13 founding members: Awalt, Buchser, Cupertino, Fremont, Homestead, Los Altos, Lynbrook, Monta Vista, Mountain View, Peterson (closed 1981), Santa Clara, Sunnyvale, Wilcox.
In 1974 the league decided to split into the two divisions based on strength. In 1976, Saratoga transferred from the West Valley Athletic League (WVAL) to the DAL. In 1981 Sunnyvale High School closed and St. Francis joined the Girls Division. Around 1982, Mt. View High School closed its Castro Street and the name transferred to the Awalt High School building. The same year, Santa Clara closed the downtown location which became Buchser Middle School, and the Santa Clara High School name transferred to the Buchser High School location. In 1981, Peterson was converted into a Middle School. In 1988 Los Gatos joined the DAL, also leaving the WVAL. In 2002 St Francis left the DAL to join the West Catholic Athletic League (WCAL).

Football Members
Football divisions for 2021

De Anza League
 Palo Alto High School
 Mountain View High School
 Milpitas High School
 Homestead High School
 Santa Clara High School
 Wilcox High School
 Los Gatos High School

El Camino League
 Saratoga High School
 Gunn High School
 Monta Vista High School
 Lynbrook High School
 Fremont High School
 Los Altos High School
 Cupertino High School

Basketball Members
Basketball divisions for 2021

De Anza League
 Palo Alto High School
 Cupertino High School
 Milpitas High School
 Santa Clara High School
 Homestead High School
 Los Altos High School
 Mountain View High School

El Camino League
 Fremont High School
 Gunn High School
 Los Gatos High School
 Lynbrook High School
 Monta Vista High School
 Saratoga High School
 Wilcox High School

Lacrosse Members
Lacrosse divisions for 2022

De Anza League
 Carlmont High School
 Los Gatos High School
 Menlo-Atherton High School
 Sequoia High School
 Palo Alto High School
 Burlingame High School

El Camino League
 Hillsdale High School
 Woodside High School
 Saratoga High School
 Aragon High School
 Leland High School
 Pioneer High School
 Gunn High School
 Los Altos High School
 Mountain View High School

Wrestling Members
Wrestling divisions for 2021

De Anza League
 Palo Alto High School
 Cupertino High School
 Fremont High School
 Los Gatos High School
 Wilcox High School
 Lynbrook High School
 Homestead High School

El Camino League
 Los Altos High School
 Gunn High School
 Mountain View High School
 Santa Clara High School
 Saratoga High School
 Milpitas High School
 Monta Vista High School

Track & Field Members
Track & Field divisions for 2021

De Anza League
 Palo Alto High School
 Gunn High School
 Homestead High School
 Los Altos High School
 Los Gatos High School
 Lynbrook High School
 Milpitas High School

El Camino League
 Cupertino High School
 Fremont High School
 Monta Vista High School
 Mountain View High School
 Santa Clara High School
 Saratoga High School
 Wilcox High School

References

CIF Central Coast Section